Paulus Hector Mair (1517–1579) was a German civil servant fencing master from Augsburg. He collected Fechtbücher and undertook to compile all knowledge of the art of fencing in a compendium surpassing all earlier books. For this, he engaged the painter Jörg Breu the Younger, as well as two experienced fencers, whom he charged with perfecting the techniques before they were painted. The project was very costly, taking a full four years, and according to Mair, consumed most of his family's income and property. Three versions of his compilation, and one later, less extensive manuscript, have been preserved.

Not only did Mair spend huge sums on his collections and on his projects, he also had a very expensive lifestyle, frequently hosting receptions for the more important burghers of Augsburg. His own income was not sufficient for this, and during many years, he misappropriated funds from the city treasury, with the supervision of which he had been entrusted since 1541. His embezzlements were discovered in 1579, and Mair was hanged as a thief at the age of 62.

Martial arts compendium

Mair compiled a voluminous, encyclopedic compendium of the martial arts of his time, collected in 16 books in two volumes. The compendium survives in three manuscript copies. The subject matter treated is:

Volume 1:
A. German longsword
B. Dussack (backsword)
C. Staff
D. Pike
E. Halberd
F. Fighting with the scythe
G. Fighting with the sickle
H. Unarmed combat (wrestling)
Volume 2:
I. Dagger
K. Spanish rapier
L. Battle axe
M. Joust, mounted combat for sport
N. Tournament history and rules
O. Judicial combat
P. Mounted combat, serious (self-defense)
Q. Fencing in plate armour (shield, spear, longsword)

Manuscripts
three copies of the compendium, in two volumes each:
 German version: Saxon State and University Library, Dresden, Mscr. Dresd. C 93/94, after 1542, two volumes, 244+328 folia.
 online facsimile: Digital Collections of the SLUB Dresden
Latin version: Bavarian state library, München cod. icon 393, after 1542, two volumes, 309+303 folia. This is the most luxurious production of Mair's, and he sold it to duke Albert V. of Bavaria, allegedly for the enormous sum of 800 fl., in 1567 (
online facsimiles: De arte athletica Tome I,  De arte athletica Tome II,   daten.digitale-sammlungen.de
bilingual Latin-German version: Austrian national library, Vienna, Codex Vindobensis 10825/26 after 1542, two volumes, 270+343 folia.
online facsimiles: microfilm scans (thearma.org)
Jörg Breu Sketchbook (Cod.I.6.2°.4), Augsburg city archive, Schätze B2 Reichsstadt, 1553, 110 folia, illustrated by  Heinrich Vogtherr, based material acquired from  Anthon Rast of Nürnberg (d. 1549).
online facsimile: media.bibliothek.uni-augsburg.de, gesellschaft-lichtenawers.eu

Literature 
Knight, David James and Brian Hunt. Polearms of Paulus Hector Mair.  Paladin Press, 2008.  .

See also
Historical European Martial Arts
German school of swordsmanship

External links

transcription of the longsword treatise (Vienna version) (Anton Kohutovič 2009, gesellschaft-lichtenawers.eu)
Paulus Hector Mair's entry on wiktenauer.com
English translation of Mair's preface (freywild.ch)

1517 births
1579 deaths
German historical fencers
German civil servants
People executed by hanging
Sportspeople from Augsburg
Executed people from Bavaria
People executed for theft
16th-century German writers
16th-century German male writers
Criminals from Bavaria
16th-century executions in the Holy Roman Empire